Stephen Hamer Hughes (11 November 1919 – 9 February 1981) was an English footballer who played as a centre-half for Oldham Athletic, Stalybridge Celtic, New Brighton, Tranmere Rovers, and Crewe Alexandra.

Career
Hughes played for Oldham Athletic, Stalybridge Celtic, New Brighton, Tranmere Rovers, and Crewe Alexandra. During World War II he played as a guest for Notts County, Liverpool, Watford, and Port Vale.

Career statistics
Source:

References

1919 births
1981 deaths
Footballers from Liverpool
English footballers
Association football defenders
Oldham Athletic A.F.C. players
Stalybridge Celtic F.C. players
New Brighton A.F.C. players
Tranmere Rovers F.C. players
Crewe Alexandra F.C. players
Notts County F.C. wartime guest players
Liverpool F.C. wartime guest players
Watford F.C. wartime guest players
Port Vale F.C. wartime guest players
English Football League players